The 2022–23 Syracuse Orange women's basketball team represents Syracuse University during the 2022–23 NCAA Division I women's basketball season. The Orange are led by first-year head coach Felisha Legette-Jack. The Orange will be tenth year members of the Atlantic Coast Conference and play their home games at the Carrier Dome in Syracuse, New York.

Prior to the season beginning Felisha Legette-Jack was announced as the head coach at Syracuse.  She took over from interim head coach Von Read.

Previous season

Previous head coach Quentin Hillsman resigned amid investigations into allegations of inappropriate behavior on August 2, 2021.  Associate Head Coach Vonn Read was named the interim head coach for the 2021–2022 season on August 4, 2021.

The Orange finished the season 11–18 overall and 4–14 in ACC play to finish in a tie for eleventh place.  As the twelfth seed in the ACC tournament, they lost to Clemson in their First Round matchup.  They were not invited to the NCAA tournament or the WNIT.

Off-season

Departures

Incoming Transfers

Recruiting Class

Source:

Roster

Schedule

Source:

|-
!colspan=6 style=| Exhibition

|-
!colspan=6 style=| Regular Season

|-
!colspan=6 style=| ACC Women's Tournament

|-
!colspan=6 style=| WNIT

Rankings

Coaches did not release a Week 2 poll and AP does not release a poll after the NCAA tournament.

See also
 2022–23 Syracuse Orange men's basketball team

References

Syracuse Orange women's basketball seasons
Syracuse
Syracuse basketball, women
Syracuse basketball, women
2023 Women's National Invitation Tournament participants